The 1939 Masters Tournament was the sixth Masters Tournament, held from March 31 to April 2 at Augusta National Golf Club in Augusta, Georgia. Due to adverse weather conditions, the first round was postponed to Friday and the final two rounds were played on Sunday.

Ralph Guldahl won his only Masters title with a tournament record 279 (−9), one stroke better than runner-up Sam Snead. He had finished as a runner-up the previous two years, and it was the third of Guldahl's three major titles; he won consecutive U.S. Open titles in 1937 and 1938.  The previous Masters record was 282 (−6) in 1935, and Guldahl's mark stood until 1953, when Ben Hogan shot 274 (−14).

The purse was $5,000 with a winner's share of $1,500. The gallery for Sunday's final two rounds was estimated at 10,000 spectators. Challenging weather conditions during the second round on Saturday included hail, wind, rain, and some sun breaks.

Field
1. Masters champions
Byron Nelson (7,9,10,12), Henry Picard (7,9,10,12), Gene Sarazen (2,4,6,7,9,10,12), Horton Smith (7,9,10,12)

2. U.S. Open champions
Tommy Armour (4,6,10), Billy Burke (9), Johnny Farrell, Ralph Guldahl (7,9,10), Walter Hagen (4,6), Bobby Jones (3,4,5,9), Tony Manero (7,9)

3. U.S. Amateur champions
Lawson Little (5,9), Jess Sweetser (5,a), Willie Turnesa (11,a)

4. British Open champions
Jock Hutchison (6), Denny Shute (6,7,10)

5. British Amateur champions
Charlie Yates (8,a)

6. PGA champions
Johnny Revolta (7,9,10), Paul Runyan (9,10,12)

7. Members of the U.S. 1937 Ryder Cup team
Ed Dudley (9), Sam Snead (12)

8. Members of the U.S. 1938 Walker Cup team
Ray Billows (a), Tommy Suffern Tailer (9,a)

Johnny Fischer (3,a), Johnny Goodman (2,3,5,11,a), Fred Haas (a), Chuck Kocsis (9,a), Reynolds Smith (a) and Bud Ward (a) did not play. Tailer was a reserve for the team.

9. Top 30 players and ties from the 1938 Masters Tournament
Harry Cooper (10), Vic Ghezzi (10), Jimmy Hines (10,12), Ben Hogan, Ky Laffoon, Ray Mangrum, Jug McSpaden (10), Dick Metz (10), Felix Serafin, Jimmy Thomson, Frank Walsh, Al Watrous

Wiffy Cox, Bobby Cruickshank and Sam Parks Jr. (2) did not play.

10. Top 30 players and ties from the 1938 U.S. Open
Joe Belfore, Jim Foulis (12), Frank Moore, Toney Penna

Olin Dutra (2,6), Willie Hunter (5), Al Huske, Stanley Kertes, Butch Kreuger, Charles Lacey, Ray Mangrum, John Rogers, Charles Sheppard, George Von Elm (3), Al Zimmerman and Emery Zimmerman did not play,11. 1938 U.S. Amateur quarter-finalists
Dick Chapman (a), Chick Harbert (a), Joe Thompson (a)Pat Abbott (a), Chris Brinke (a) and Ed Kingsley (a) did not play.12. 1938 PGA Championship quarter-finalists

13. Two players, not already qualified, with the best scoring average in the winter part of the 1939 PGA Tour
Jimmy Demaret, Craig Wood

14 Foreign invitations
Stanley Horne

Additional invitation
Ted Adams (a) winner of 1938 Canadian Amateur Championship

Round summaries
First roundFriday, March 31, 1939Source:

Second roundSaturday, April 1, 1939Source:

Third roundSunday, April 2, 1939   (morning)Final roundSunday, April 2, 1939   (afternoon)''

Final leaderboard

Sources:

References

External links
Masters.com – past winners and results
Augusta.com – 1939 Masters leaderboard and scorecards

1939
1939 in golf
1939 in American sports
1939 in sports in Georgia (U.S. state)
March 1939 sports events
April 1939 sports events